North Karelia Brigade (PKarPr) is a former Finnish Army unit that was situated in Kontioranta, Kontiolahti. The brigade was closed down at the end of 2013.

Annually 1500 recruits started their military service in Kontioranta. The brigade was the infantry centre of Eastern Finland: it trained soldiers to work in the roadless circumstances in North Karelia, Southern Savonia and Northern Savonia. The majority of conscripts were from that area. There were about 300 staff and career personnel. The last commander of the Brigade was Colonel Jari Kytölä.

History

The brigade lineage goes back to 1941, when the 10th Brigade was founded after the Winter War. The brigade formed the 10th Infantry Regiment during the Continuation War. Renamed 3rd Infantry Regiment, the regiment formed a Jäger Battalion in 1948. The battalion was first renamed the 5th Jäger Battalion in 1952, and then Karelian Jäger Battalion in 1957 before being renamed Pohjois-Karjalan Prikaati in 1990. 

The brigade was disbanded at the end of 2013 alongside five other Finnish Defence Forces units.

Heraldry and traditions

The brigade kept the traditions of multiple prior units, including those of the Viipuri Regiment and Infantry Regiment 9. The brigade anniversary on 20 November commemorates the 1700 Battle of Narva.

The brigade flag consisted of a white cross, dividing the flag into red and black quarters. The cross is overlaid by the dueling arms and crown of the coat of arms of the Province of Karelia.

The brigade insignia consisted of the two swords shown in the coat of arms of the Province of Karelia on top of a laurel wreath. A crown adorned the top of the insignia. Designed by Juhani Vepsäläinen, the insignia was made official on 29 May 1990.

The brigade cross  was confirmed on 24 April 1991. It was a red-and-black cross pattée overlaid by the dueling arms and crown of the coat of arms of the Province of Karelia.

The composer of the march is not known, with the melody going back at least to the 18th century.

Composition
 Karelia Jaeger Battalion
 Jaeger Company
 Mortar Company
 Sissi Company
 Antitank Company
 Headquarters and Maintenance Company
 Karelia Military Band
 Non-commissioned officer School
 Maintenance Center

Commanders
 Colonel (1990) Ilkka Hollo Jul 1. to Dec 31. 1990
 Colonel (1991) Pekka Ripatti 1991 to 1994
 Colonel (1994) Lauri Ruonansuu 1994 to 1998
 Colonel Antti Lankinen 1998 to 2000
 Colonel (1999) Asko Kohvakka 2000 to 2002
 Colonel (2002) Keijo Simola Nov 1. 2002 to Feb 29. 2004
 Colonel (2003) Harri Ohra-Aho Mar 1. 2004 to Dec 31. 2006
 Colonel (2003) Viljo Hyvärinen Jan 1. 2007 to Sep 30. 2009
 Colonel (2005) Jari Kytölä Oct 1. 2009 to Dec 31. 2013

References

External links
 https://web.archive.org/web/20100103134454/http://www.mil.fi/maavoimat/joukot/pkarpr/index.dsp (in Finnish)

Brigades of Finland
Kontiolahti
Military units and formations disestablished in 2013